Pristimantis riveroi is a species of frog in the family Strabomantidae. It is endemic to Venezuela and only known from the region of the type locality in the Serranía del Litoral in the state of Aragua. The specific name riveroi honours Juan A. Rivero, a Puerto Rican herpetologist. Accordingly, common name Rivero's ground frog has been proposed for it.

Description
Adult males measure  and adult females  in snout–vent length. The snout is acuminate to subacuminate in dorsal view. The tympanum is just discernible; the supratympanic fold is low and not obscuring the tympanum. Dorsal skin is smooth but has scattered, pungent warts. Fingers and toes have board discs. Living animals are mossy green and may have pale-gray blotching or mottling. The snout can be gray or white. Males have a subgular vocal sac

Habitat and conservation
It is an arboreal species that breeds by direct development (i.e., there is no free-living larval stage). It is locally common and faces no known threats. It is present in the Henri Pittier National Park.

References

riveroi
Frogs of South America
Amphibians of Venezuela
Endemic fauna of Venezuela
Amphibians described in 1993
Taxa named by Enrique La Marca
Taxa named by John Douglas Lynch
Taxonomy articles created by Polbot